The Drona Parva, or the Book of Drona, is the seventh of eighteen books of the Indian epic Mahabharata. Drona Parva traditionally has 8 parts and 204 chapters. The critical edition of Drona Parva has 8 parts and 173 chapters.

Drona Parva describes the appointment of Drona as commander-in-chief of the Kaurava alliance, on the 11th day of the Kurukshetra War, the next four days of battles, and his death on the 15th day of the 18-day war. The parva recites how the war became more brutal with each passing day, how agreed rules of a just war began to be ignored by both sides as loved ones on each side were slain, how the war extended into the night, and how millions of more soldiers and major characters of the story - Abhimanyu, Jayadratha, Drona, Ghatotkacha - died during the war.

Structure and chapters
This Parva (book) traditionally has 8 sub-parvas (parts or little books) and 204 adhyayas (sections, chapters). The following are the sub-parvas:

 1. Dronābhisheka Parva (Chapters: 1–16)
 With Bhishma fatally injured and on his death bed of arrows, Kauravas remembered the mighty warrior Karna. Karna meets Bhishma and asks his permission to join the war. Bhishma allows. Karna meets Kauravas and consoles them on the loss of Bhishma. Duryodhana appoints Drona - their teacher - as replacement commander-in-chief for the war. Thus Drona is crowned as the new chief of the Kauravas army.

 11th day war

 Drona arrays his army in the form of a Sakata (vehicle), while their illustrious foes, in Krauncha (crane) form. Duryodhana asks Drona to seize Yudhisthira alive. Drona promises him under limitation to divert Arjuna, from the battle field as Drona can't defeat Arjuna. King Yudhisthira learns it, through his spies, and addresses Arjuna. Arjuna tells him to not worry, as he himself with undefeated streaks will protect him, even if himself wielder of thunderbolt, or Vishnu with gods, assists them, they will not succeed. Drona starts with slaughtering Panchalas, invoking into existence many celestial weapons, within a very short time, trembling all. Dhrishtadyumna battles Drona but gets defeated and his army gets fled. Arjuna engages long duel with Drona. Drona can't defeat Arjuna and Arjuna didn't have a motive to kill his own guru. Shakuni with 100 followers, rush towards Sahadeva. Sahadeva cuts his bow and destroys his car. Sakuni hurling a mace kills his charioteer. Both comes down and fight with mace. Bhima battles Vivinsati. Shalya battles  Nakula. Nakula after vanquishing him, blew his conch.Karna defeats Satyaki. Drupada battles Bhagadatta.  Mastya king Virata engages battle with mighty Kritavarma and Narayani sena. Bhurisrava and Sikhandin, encountered each other and Sikhandin with his shafts caused him to tremble. Gatotkacha and Alamvusha battles. Abhimanyu knocking Purava, drags him helplessly. Jayadratha comes there to help, with shield and sword and battles him. Abhmanyu knocks Jayadratha and then battles Salya division. Salya hurls an iron dart, and Abhimanyu seizing it hurled it back slewing his driver. All applauds Abhimanyu and his foes surrounds him. Then Abhimanyu along with 22 maharathis attack Drona but Drona defeats them all. Drishtadyumna engages battle with Ashwatthama but gets defeated. Bhima joins Abhimanyu and destroy the Kaurava forces and the army fled away. Drona comes to rally his troops and rush at Yudhishthira. Drona cutting off Yudhishthira's bow, slew Kumara. Then Bhardwaja's son pierces all in his vicinity and felled Yugandhara. Then Virata, Drupada, Satyaki, Dhrishtadyumna and many others pierces Drona. Drona roared aloud and beheaded Singhasena and Vyaghradatta. All cries loud for protection. Arjuna comes, routing the Kurus, with shower of arrows. There created, caused by carnage, a river whose water were blood, with bones and bodies. At sunset, withdrawal of troops occurs on both sides. All praises Partha with speech, for vanquishing foes.

 2. Samsaptakabadha Parva (Chapters: 17–32)
 On 12th day, Duryodhana sends Narayani sena (army). Narayani sena was powerful and each soldier was equal to 10000 soldiers. At time of war preparation, Duryodhana opted this leaving Krishna to Arjuna. Arjuna cleverly shot the weapon called Tvashtra, making thousands of his separate illusion, confounding them. The troops began to strike each other, each regarding the other Arjuna's self. After destruction, Arjuna with drew his special weapon Tvashtra. Recovering, they showered diverse kind of arrows, overwhelming them both. Arjuna uses Vayavya weapon, boring away crowds of foes with steeds, elephants and weapons, as if these were dry leaves of trees. Drona proceeded for Yudhishthira, arraying his force in the form of a Garuda and Yudhishthira disposed his troops in counter array in the form of a semi-circle. Dhrishtadyumna rush at Drona. Durmukha checks Dhrishtadyumna and Drona slaughters Yudhishthira host. Then Satyajit, invoking a mighty weapon, pierced Drona injuring him and damages his car and driver. Drona cuts his bow, slew Vrika by destroying his car supporting Satyajit. Drona repeatedly cuts off Satyajit bow, before head. Upon his slaughter, Yudhishthira, from fear of Drona, fled away. Satanika, with army comes to stop Drona and he, with a sharp arrow, cuts Satanika head, all warriors fled away. Drona then vanquished armies, trembling them with fear and made blood river to flow. Then many Pandava warriors, headed by Kunti's son, surrounded Drona on all sides, with their divisions and all pierces Drona. Drona felled Dridhasena, king Kshema, Vasudana, Kshatradeva and pierces others. Drona approaches Yudhishthira and that best of kings, quickly fled away from the preceptor. Then he felled Panchalya destroying his car. All cries, 'Slay Drona, Slay Drona!'. Drona mangled and vanquished all including Satyaki. Seeing all routing, Kaurava enjoys and Duryodhana talks with Karna. Karna advises to support Drona. Pandava returns with celestial bows. The two old men Drupada and Drona encounters. Son of Duhsasana resisted son of Arjuna by Draupadi, Srutakirti. Vikarna resisted Sikhandin. Karna resisted 5 Kekaya brothers. Bhurisravas resisted king Manimant. Ghatotkacha encounters Alamvusha. Duryodhana with elephant division rush against Bhimasena. He broke that elephant division, routing, turning them back. Duryodhana battles Bhima and both mangles each other. Bhima cuts Duryodhana bow. Ruler of Angas comes on elephant but gets killed by Bhima, his division fled away, crushing foot-soldiers as they fled. King Bhagadatta rush at Arjuna and overwhelms them both with arrowy shower. Janardana protects car from elephant charge and elephant crushed many soldiers. He then pierced Krishna and Partha cuts his bow including slaying the warriors protecting his flank. Indra's son cut open elephant armor, damages his standard and pierces Bhagadatta. Bhagadatta hurls some lances  displacing Arjuna's diadem. Arjuna teases him, cuts his bow, and afflicts his vital limbs. Filled then with rage, he, with Mantras, turned his hook into the Vaishnava weapon and hurls it at Arjuna. Kesava covering Arjuna, receives it on his chest and it turned into garland. Arjuna asks the reason of his involvement and Krishna tells him about the boon he gave with all slaying Vaishnava weapon, until it is kept by user he shall not be slayable, and Bhagadatta is now open. Arjuna suddenly overwhelms Bhagadatta, slew his elephant, then king. Arjuna shows respect to king Bhagadatta, faces Sakuni army and uses explosive weapons for felling them. Sakuni uses illusion for confounding them and to shower weapons upon Arjuna. Arjuna uses celestial weapon, shooting clouds of arrows, slewing his followers. Then a thick darkness covers them and from within that gloom harsh voices rebuked Arjuna. The latter, however, by means of the weapons called Jyotishka, dispelled that darkness. When that darkness was dispelled, frightful waves of water appeared. Arjuna applied the weapon called Aditya, drying up those water. Destroying those diverse illusions repeatedly created by Suvala, Arjuna laughs at him. Upon all his illusions being destroyed, unmanned by fear, Sakuni fled away. Arjuna then slaughters Kaurava host, and they fled away. With one arrow, he afflicted multiple enemies. Drona's son Ashwatthama fights a terrible battle with King Nila and beheads him. Pandava host tremble at Nila death. Abhimanyu began slaughtering and Karna rushes against Abhimanyu.  Drona started duel with Yudhishtira and Abhimanyu engages battle with Drona.Bheema along with Satyaki attack Karna but Karna makes them fled away. With all his might Abhimanyu resists Bhagdattta but gets defeated and then 17 maharathis attack Bhagdattta but Bhagdattta defeats them all.Finally Bhagdattta fights and gives a tough fight to Arjuna but gets killed.

 3. Abhimanyu-vadha Parva (Chapters: 33–71)

The Kaurava commander-in-chief Dronacharya planned to divert Arjuna and Krishna away to chase an army of the samsaptakhas whom Arjuna defeated that very day. The Kaurava army was grouped into the giant discus formation, which caused great loss for the Pandavas. If the formation continued till end of that day, the pandavas would have no army by sunset. The only two people on the Pandava army who completely knew about how to enter and break this formation were Arjuna and Krishna, who were away. Abhimanyu's story came to prominence when he entered the powerful Chakravyuha battle formation of the Kaurava army. Abhimanyu claimed that he could decimate the entire Kaurava army.
Abhimanyu was trained in all types of warfare by Lord Krishna and Balrama themselves, and later by Pradyumna (Sri Krishna's son). Abhimanyu learnt the art of breaking into the Chakravyuha when he was in Subhadra's womb. It was then Arjuna was narrating the art of breaking into Chakravyuha to Subhadra. But he did not know how to destroy the formation once he was inside, as Subhadra fell asleep while listening to the story and (Abhimanyu in her womb) could learn only half of the technique. This is the reason why he was only able to enter and break but not come out of the Chakravyuha.
As soon as Abhimanyu entered the formation, Jayadrath, the ruler of Sindh blocked the other Pandavas, so that Abhimanyu was left alone.  Inside the Chakravyuha, the trapped Abhimanyu went on a killing rampage, intending on carrying out the original strategy by himself and killing tens of thousands of Kaurava soldiers. Abhimanyu killed many prominent heroes including Duryodhana's son Lakshmana, Shalya's sons Rukmanagaa and Rukmanaratha, younger brothers of Karna , and many advisers of Karna, Rukmaratha, Kritavarma's son Matrikavata, Shrutanjaya,
Ashavketu (From Magadha), Chandraketu, Mahavega, Suvarcha, Suryabhasa, Kalakeya (Shakuni's brother), Vasatiya, and rathas from the Brahma-Vasatiyas and Kekayas, King of Kosala - King Brihadbala, King of Amvashtas and his son and many others.  Abhimanyu defeated the mighty warriors of Kauravas side including Duryodhana, Ashwatthama, Dushasana, Kritvarma, Shalya, Drona, Kripa and Karna. No Kaurava warrior could escape his arrows. Abhimanyu killed all the remaining foster brothers Karna became angry and attacked Abhimanyu and destroys his invincible armor. Abhimanyu broke Ashwatthama's chariot.Dushasan's son kills Abhimanyu in a mace fight. 
Sage Vyasa comh new stories to tell Yudhishthira. He tells him to not suffer and become stupefied by calamities, brave heroes ascend to heaven at death, death takes all, this law is incapable of being transgressed.

 4. Pratijna Parva (Chapters: 72–84)
 Jishnu, having slain large numberf Samsaptakas by means of his celestial weapons, returns, and learning about his son death griefs. Vasudeva consoles him saying, 'yield not to grief, death is certain for heroes that do not retreat.' Arjuna rebukes them to not able to save Abhimanyu. Yudhishthira tells him that they followed Abhimanyu, but king of Sindhus, Jayadratha, checked them all. Arjuna swears to slay Jayadratha next day, if before sunset he fails to do so, he will enter blazing fire for suicide. Pandavas army made loud uproar for Arjuna and spies informed, Jayadratha, who goes to Duryodhana asking him he is going back to his home from desirous of life. Duryodhana says they with forces, will surround him on all sides, to protect. Jayadratha then, accompanied by Duryodhana, repaired that very night to Drona, who tells them that he will form Sakata (a kind of vehicle) array for offence and, half a lotus with needle-mouthed array, for Jayadratha defence. Vasudeva addresses Dhananjaya that he swore alone with the consent of his brothers, without consulting him, is an act of rashness, and taken up a great weight upon his shoulders. Arjuna brags of his celestial prowess with celestial bow and disregard Krishna words. Then Vasudeva as per Arjuna's words, goes to comfort Subhadra. Subhadra laments and doubts Pandavas strength, as they could not protect her son. Arjun then receives a victory boon from Lord Shiva for 14th day

 5. Jayadratha-vadha Parva (Chapters: 85–152)
 On 14th day, Drona appointed 21,000 foot-soldiers for protection of Jayadratha. Duhsasana caused Arjuna to be surrounded by an elephant force. Arjuna slays elephants with riders. Killed 2-3 warriors with single shot. Duhsasana's forces thus slaughtered, fled with leader. Savyasachi defeats Drona after fighting for a while. Kritavarman with 10,000 followers comes to oppose the progress of Dhananjaya. Arjuna blasted that army, seeing Drona pursuing. Combatants fled. Krishna sees waste of time and address Partha to show no mercy. King Srutayudha rush at Arjuna, who got a divine mace from Varuna, with boon as long as is kept by him is immortal, but never hurl it at unarmed or it will come back to fall upon him after strike. He hurls it at Janardana, striking his shoulder, mace returns and he dies. Troops fled. Sudakshina rush at Phalguna, in wrath, hurls a dart, which pierces through Arjuna, swooned him away. Recovering, Arjuna felled him down. Troops fled. Troops surrounded Arjuna but fled from terror, again rallied and Arjuna felled their heads. Srutayus and Achyutayus battles Arjuna & Arjuna defeats them. Arjuna invoked into existence Sakra weapon. From that weapon flowed thousands of shafts, depriving his foes of their arms and heads, slew 50 warriors. Karna attacks, Arjuna defeated Karna and then slew Niyatayus and Dirghayus. Urged by Duryodhana, elephant division of Angas, surrounds Arjuna. Partha, however, with shaft from Gandiva, cut off their heads and arms, killing 1000 of warriors. Srutayus resisted Arjuna and struck both of them with mace on foot. Arjuna cuts his arm then his head. Kuru ranks fled. Seeing this mighty warriors Ashwatthama,Shalya, Kripa attack Arjuna. Avengeful Arjuna defeats, Kripa and Ashwatthama. Arjuna cuts off Shalya's  bow, flag and pierces 10 shafts  Shalya flee. Then Arjuna blasts Ashwatthama's chariot and pierces him with 17 shafts and also pierces Kripa. Duryodhana repairs to Drona and blames his useless formation. Drona says he is old, not fast as Arjuna and he is protecting gate of formation. Drona tell him to go fight himself. Duryodhana says how is it possible for him to resist Dhananjaya. Drona gives him an armor, saying it is impenetrable to human weapons. Duryodhana, set out for Partha. Parthas and Dhrishtadyumna, penetrates into Kaurava army. Drona agitates the Pandava host. Dhrishtadyumna with Pandavas pushed back Drona with his troops. Drona got filled with wrath, and began to kill multiple enemies with a single arrow. No warriors fled from fear this time. Dhrishtadyumna tries to do stunt in battle with shield and sword but Drona cuts everything . When Drona  was about to slay him, Satyaki saves him. Dhrishtadyumna withdrew from battle. Drona battles Satyaki, both gets covered in blood, and divisions became spectators of that single combat. Satyaki cuts Drona bow 16 times and the son of Bhardwaja, mentally applauds the prowess of Satyaki. Drona aims weapons at him but Satyaki baffles it with his own weapon. Then Drona invoked Agneya weapon and Satyaki invoked Varuna weapon to baffle it. Sun starts to come down from top. Sons of Madri comes to protect Satyaki, and Duhsasana with thousands of princes comes for protecting Drona.  Bhima defeated Drona, Kripa and went in search of Arjun Karna attacked Bhima.Karna cuts Bheema"s bow. Karna also blasted Bheema's spades, swords, maces etc. But Karna spared Bheema ’s life. Arjuna slays Vinda, and his younger brother Anuvinda, struck Vasudeva on forehead with mace. Arjuna cuts all his limbs, then kills his followers. Arjuna horses gets tired, he comes on ground, all rush at him, but resisted by Arjuna. Arjuna remounts. Soldiers flew away from battle against Arjuna, like atheists turning away from the Vedas. Seeing Duryodhana, Vasudeva praises him and reminds his evil conspiracy to Arjuna, to slay him. Duryodhana proceeds without fear and all applauds him. All said,'The king is slain'. Duryodhana asks Arjuna to show his manliness, by using all weapons to harm him and cuts Vasudeva whip with a broad-headed arrow. All shots of Arjuna repelled by armor. Krishna mocks Arjuna of his decayed prowess. Savyasachin then made Duryodhana carless and cuts leathern fence of his fingers. Then pierces Kuru king in his palms. Warriors comes to rescue him, and gets slaughtered. Satyaki engaged a duel with Kritavarma and Bhima attacked Kauravas. As per Duryodhana’s order, Karna went in aid of Kauravas. Karna defeated Bheema  in archery. Karna broke Bheema’s bow. Knowing that it was impossible to defeat Karna in archery  Bheema picked up sword and jumped out of his chariot. Bhima –Karna sword duel began Karna injured Bheema heavily.Bheema  ran away and gave way for Kauravas . Duryodhana with 8 car-warriors surrounded Arjuna. Arjuna cuts Salya bow 2 times and Bhurisrava filled with rage, cut off the goad, and struck Arjuna. Alamvusha resisted Bhimasena. Karna and king Bahlika joined in aid of Alamvusha, Bhima broke Karna’s chariot. Bhima slew Bahlika and defeated Alambusha and Karna. Karna ran away. Bhima goes and meet Arjuna. Karna comes to battle Bhima.Karna cuts Bheema's  bow seven times and destroyed his chariot too five times. Karna  made Bhima  unconscious.  (56)Bhima in another  battle killed 20 more Kaurava brothers who came to aid Karna, including Vikarna in front of Karna, Duryodhana. A blood river flowed for enhancing the joy of heroes. Bhima then strikes Karna's forehead and Karna retreats . Satyaki checked all and slew steeds of Duhsasana. Then he battles Trigarta divisions and made them flee away. Bhurisrava comes and challenges Satyaki for battle. Both rebukes each other and then fights. When both became carless, sword fight occurs. When sword broke, wrestling occurs. They did different manoeuvres for encounter. At last, Bhurisrava struck Satyaki and brought him down upon the ground. And dragging him, drew his sword, seizing Satyaki by the hair of his head and struck him at the chest with his feet. Vasudeva addresses Arjuna and Arjuna mentally applauds the Kuru warrior. When Bhurisrava about to whirl the sword, a shaft from Gandiva comes cutting his arm. All reproved the son of Pandu and Arjuna gives excuse. Bhurisrava sits in meditation leaving war aside. Then all the persons in the entire army began to speak ill of both and applauded Bhurisravas, that bull among men. Arjuna says his vows are more important than war rules, but Bhurisrava remained silent. Satyaki rises, draws his sword. All the warriors censure him for his intention. But deprived of reason, he slew Bhurisravas while in the observance of his vow. All gods applauds Bhurisravas. Satyaki gives excuse for his act, and none said anything to him, but all mentally applauded Bhurisravas. Duryodhana sends Karna, saying, victory will be theirs, if sun sets. Arjuna comes slaughtering host. Sun gets red. Aswatthaman fails to resist Arjuna and Arjuna fights all protecting Jayadratha. Use of celestial weapons occur in that battle. Dhananjaya cuts his bow and shot a solar shaft towards Karna, but that shaft cut off by Aswatthaman. Arjuna then destroys Karna car. Aswatthaman, caused him to ride on his car. Then Arjuna, invoked into existence the Varuna weapon on all sides. Then he invoked into existence the Aindra weapon. Thousands of shafts, flowed through that weapon, killing thousands of warriors. Blood current formed on earth. Arjuna proceeds towards Jayadratha, battles him, and cut off head of his driver. Meanwhile, the sun was about to set. Krishna addresses Arjuna and uses his powers to create darkness. All sheathe their weapons, thinking sun had set. And Arjuna taking opportunity, starts to slaughter host. The protectors of Jayadratha got puzzled, and fled. Arjuna defeats Karna, his son and felled Salya's driver. Krishna tells him process of killing Jayadratha. Arjuna using celestial arrow, cuts Jayadratha head and by shooting shafts repeatedly, sent it out at Jayadratha's father lap. As latter stood after finishing his prayers it suddenly felled down on the earth. And as the head of Jayadratha fell down on the earth, the head of Vriddhakshatra, cracked into hundred pieces, as per his own curse. All applauds both of them and Vasudeva withdraws that darkness. While searching for Jayadrath on the battlefield, Arjuna slew 7 akshauhinis (a battle formation that consisted of 153,090 chariots (Sanskrit Ratha); 153,090 elephants; 459,270 cavalries and 765450 infantry) of Kaurava soldiers. Pandava enjoys their victory. Kripa and Aswatthaman in wrath, afflicted Arjuna. Dhananjaya made Kripa swoon away and driver of Kripa's car bore him away from the battle. Aswatthaman, from fear, fled away. Karna attacked Satyaki and made him carless. Arjuna vows to slay Vrishsena (Karna's son). Sun sets. Krishna repairs to Yudhishthira, the son of Dharma, and tells him about Jayadratha slaughter. Duryodhana talks with Drona and blames Drona for taking Arjuna leniently, since he is his disciple. Drona says that he will for him penetrate into enemy host. Duryodhana then speaks with Karna about that matter. Karna says, that it is not Drona's fault, Arjuna is accomplished in weapons and the preceptor, is old and incapable of proceeding quickly. Fight continues....

 6. Ghatotkacha-vadha Parva (Chapters: 153–184)
 Fight continues past sunset, with Duryodhana, penetrating into enemy host, slaughtering and making them run away. Yudhishthira cuts his bow, then pierces him with a fierce shaft such that, he sat on his car. Drona quickly showed himself there in that battle, and all mighty car warriors proceeded against Drona in battle. The night became pitch dark, enhancing the terrors of the timid. All these, however, that advanced against the illustrious Drona, were either obliged to turn back or despatched to the abode of Yama. Drona alone pierced with his shafts, millions of foot-soldiers and steeds. Drona despatched all Kaikeyas and the sons of Dhrishtadyumna into the world of spirits. Then he beheaded king Sivi. Vrikodara, leaping from his car to ruler of Kalinga, slew him with his fist. His bone broke and fell on earth. Then he crushed, by blow of his fist, Dhruva and Jayarata. Next, (58)Bhima crushed with fist 2 Kaurava brothers. All kings fled away in his vicinity. Somdatta challenges Satyaki, for his cruel action of slaying his unarmed son (Bhurisrava) by breaking war rules. Satyaki says he did good and will do the same to him. Duryodhana sends 11,000 warriors for Somdatta and Dhrishtadyumna accompanied by force comes to aid Satyaki. Satyaki pierces Somadatta and swooned him away 2 times. His driver, bore him away from the battle. Drona comes and Yudhishthira from other side comes for battle. Drona pierces all, slaughtering host, made them fled in fear in the very sight of Arjuna. Aswatthama battle Gatot and vanquishes him two times. Valhika hurling a dart swooned away Bhima and Bhima hurling a mace snatched away the head of Valhika. 10 Kaurava brothers comes and dies at hand of Bhima. Drona's son goes to battle, and slewing many warriors, made them fled. Dhrishtadyumna surrounds him with 100 of warriors and challenges him. Drona's son cut his bow and car, then he trembled Pandava host. Slewing a hundred Panchalas, made others fled. Yudhishthira and Bhimasena battles Drona's son. King Duryodhana aided by Bhardwaja's son comes in that encounter. Drona destroys his foes, by means of the Vayavya weapon. Panchalas fled away, from fear. Arjuna comes rallying troops and slaughters Kauravas , making them fly away. Somadatta again battle Satyaki. Somadatta cuts his bow and Satyaki too cuts his bow, damaging car in addition. Bhima comes to aid Satyaki. Satyaki make him bowless and carless, then kills him. Yudhishthira routs enemy troops and Drona rush against him for battle. Vasudeva comes and tell Yudhishthira that he is not fit to fight with Drona, but go fight instead by Bhima's side. Yudhishthira, reflecting for a moment, proceeds. Lamps and torches were lit to illuminate area visibility. The gods came there seeing that light to watch. Kritavarman resisted Yudhishthira. Kritavarman cuts his bow and Yudhishthira his bow and leathern fence in hands. Kritavarman made him carless, then cuts his sword, shield and armor. Yudhishthira quickly retreated from battle. Satyaki felled Bhuri. Bhima battle King Duryodhana. Duryodhana cuts Bhima bow 5 times and damages his car. Bhima in wrath hurled a heavy mace, crushing his car and regarded Suyodhana to had been slain in darkness, enjoyed. When Ghatotkach started using illusionary powers against Kauravas. Then all the warriors of Kauravas retreated except Dronacharya and Ashwatthama. Dronacharya was battling on the other front that time.Then Ashwatthama alone faced Ghatotkach and countered 100s of illusions of the latter. He was one out of the two warriors who has seized a celestial weapon by his bare arms. He seized terrible Asani of celestial workmanship by his bare arms which was invoked against him by Ghatotkach. Then he hurled it back against the latter which forced the latter to jump from his chariot and his chariot with steeds and charioteer were burnt into ashes within moments.He fought valiantly against Ghatotkach During the progress of battle he killed Anjanaparvan(Son of Ghatotkachh).He killed many warriors Of Panchals, sons of Drupada, 10 sons of Kuntibhoja(cousins of Pandavas),etc. He killed 1 Akshauhini of Rakshasas by ordinary bow and ordinary chariot within Moments(twinkling of eye) in the very sight of Bheema,Arjuna,Lord Krishna.
Ghatotkach was frequently getting assistance from Bheema Dhristadyumna Yudhishthir and many Pandavas troops but Ashwatthama kept his senses under control and battled against all of them single handedly for very long time. At last after slaying many great warriors Ashwatthama, shot a terrible shaft on Ghatotkach’s chest which swooned away Ghatotkach. Then, Dhristadyumna took the latter away from Ashwatthama’s presence.And Pandavas troops headed by Yudhishthira including Bheema also retreated from Ashwatthama’s presence.
Ashwatthama took weapons of full 8 carts in that long Duel.Also Rakshasas power were obviously high due to Night factor in that battle. He not only defeated Ghatotkachh but also forced him to flee several times that night during the battle. All the forces with Apsaras and many more applauded him for his act. Then after sometime Ghatotkach once more battled Ashwatthama.This time he fainted Ashwatthama for a moment then Dronacharya’s son quickly recovered his senses and once more swooned Ghatotkach for a long time (because Ghatotkachh’s driver retreated), thus constituting another defeat for Ghatotkach. Karna, the son of Vikartana, resisted Sahadeva in that battle. Karna cuts his bow and despatched his driver, to Yama's abode. Then he cuts all weapons of Sahadeva. Sahadeva left the battle, while pursued by the son of Radha. Then touching him with bow, Karna said, 'Do not, O hero, fight in battle with those that are superior to thee. Fight with thy equals, O son of Madri or return home if thou likest.' Having said these words, that foremost of car-warriors, smilingly proceeded on his car against the troops of the king of Panchalas. The slayer of foes, that mighty car warrior, devoted to truth, slew not the son of Madri although he had got the opportunity, recollecting the words of Kunti. Sahadeva, then, heartless and afflicted with arrows, proceeds to another side. Salya made Virata swooned away. Duryodhana talks and criticizes Karna and Drona. Then Drona, Sakuni, Karna and Vrishasena goes against Satyaki and Dhrishtadyumna divisions. They slaughter their troops and routs them. Janardana talks with  Phalguna. Karna battles Dhrishtadyumna. Karna cuts his bow and make him carless. Then the valiant Dhrishtadyumna, jumps down from his car taking up a mace, approaching Karna, slew his four steeds. Then turning back with great speed, quickly ascends the car of Dhananjaya.. King Yudhishthira, beholding his army flying away, talks with Phalguna. Krishna tells him that there is none else, save Dhananjaya and the Rakshasa Ghatotkacha, capable of advancing against Karna in battle. Time for Arjuna is not yet so Ghatotkacha must go. Rakshasa gets inspired with greater strength at night, giving advantage to Ghatotkacha, who enters field. Duryodhana sends Alamvusha for him. Gatotkacha cuts every weapon and car of him. Alamvusha, wrathfully struck him, with fists, trembling him. Ghatotkacha chops him, then press him upon ground. Alamvusha then seize, drag and throw him down. Then both uses power of illusion, solicitous of destroying each other. Ghatotkacha at last, seizes him and press him down on the earth. Taking a scimitar, cut off from his trunk, foe head. He then seize and throw that head on Duryodhana's car saying that Karna will be like this soon. Radha's son battles Ghatotkacha. Karna uses celestial weapons and Gatotkacha his illusive powers. All fled. Karna destroys his car. Gatotkacha then started to destroy celestial weapon of Karna, but Karna was not at all agitated and invoked more celestial weapon. Karna aiming Vayavya weapon, destroys his illusion and Gatotkacha shooting an Anjalika weapon, quickly cut off the bow of Karna. Karna afflicts him and destroys his Rakshasa host. The Rakshasa, excited with rage, hurled at him an Asani weapon. Karna, placing his bow on his car, jumps and seizing that Asani hurled it back, reducing Ghatotkacha car to ashes, while later jumps down. All creatures applauded Karna, who, having achieved that feat, once more ascended his car. Then Karna starts to destroy the illusion made by Rakshasa. Duryodhana sends Rakshasa Alayudha, who goes to battle Bhimasena. His followers gets frightened by Bhima but were again rallied. Krishna sends others to busy Karna while sends Gatotkacha for Bhima help. Meanwhile, Karna, in that battle agitated Dhrishtadyumna and Sikhandin army. Alayudha struck Ghatotkacha, on the head, with a gigantic Parigha, making him in a partial swoon. Recovering consciousness, Ghatotkacha hurls a mace, crushing Alayudha car, but with the help of illusion, later jumped down. Then both destroys each other illusions and gets wounded. At last Gatotkacha beheads him and enjoys. Till that time, Karna broke and retreated troops. Gatotkacha returns and approach him. When Gatotkacha couldn't prevail over Karna, he invoked into existence a fierce and mighty weapon, with which he slew steeds and driver of Karna, then made himself invisible. All gets frightened that he will certainly slay Karna by appearing next to him. Karna covers himself with celestial weapon and an illusion appears in the sky, from which shower of weapons occur slaughtering Kaurava host. Karna didn't fled from battle and his steeds were slain by Rakshasa. At last, he was forced to used Vasavi dart by his army and slew Gatotkacha. Before dying fall, Ghatotkacha increases his size and crushed full 1 unit of Kaurava ranks, benefitting Pandavas. All Pandavas griefs except Vasudeva who when asked by Arjuna tells him that Karna shakti weapon being baffled through Ghatotkacha, is already slain. There is no human being in the world who can stand in front of Karna if he possesses shakti weapon and if he also had armor and earrings, then he could also conquer the three worlds including the gods. At that stage, even Indra, Kubera, Varuna, or Yamraj could not face the war with him. We too were unable to win over him. For his benefit, Indra tricked him for armor and earrings. Even though all these things are not with him today, he cannot be killed by anyone other than him. Devoted to Brahmanas, truthful in speech, engaged in penances, observant of vows, kind even unto foes, for these reasons Karna is called Vrisha (Dharma). Even if the entire god and demons attack from four sides, they cannot win him. Being deprived of the power of Armor, earrings, and Indra Vasavi he has become a simple human being today. Yudhishthira become cheerless at Karna and griefs for Ghatotkacha death. Krishna comforts him. Yudhishthira with Sikhandin proceeded against Karna. Vasudeva tells Dhananjaya to help him. Vyasa appears and tells Yudhishthira to cease anger, as on the fifth day after this, he will be the king and disappears. Then at Yudhishthira command all rush to slay Drona, enemy commander. The King Duryodhana, desiring to protect Drona's life, comes with army. Till that time, it became midnight and warriors started to feel sleepy. All retreats.

 7. Drona-vadha Parva (Chapters: 185–193)
 This sub-book describes how Drona - the teacher who taught both Kauravas and Pandavas brothers - died on the battlefield on 15th day of battle. Before battle, Duryodhana talks with Drona and rebukes him for forgiving Pandavas, saying he has many great celestial weapons for what use, if he does not use them. Drona says he cannot do such ignoble act, from desire of victory and applauds Arjuna prowess. He tells him to himself face Arjuna with his followers who are the root of this war. Drona forms two divisions of army and coming ahead challenges kings. Drupada and Virata comes to battle him. Drona took life of 3 grandsons of Drupada, who came to support. Next he vanquished in that battle the Chedis, the Kaikeyas, the Srinjayas and all Matsyas. Then he cut both kings bows, then despatches both Drupada and Virata unto the abode of Yama. Dhrishtadyumna beholding those feats of Drona, and death of his father Drupada, became filled with rage & grief, and swore to slay Drona. Then prince Dhrishtadyumna, supported by his own division, advanced against Drona. Arjuna comes from one side, and Duryodhana, Karna, Sakuni, Kaurava brothers comes to protect Drona from other side. Bhimasena addresses Dhrishtadyumna and then penetrates into Drona's array. During that great carnage of the Kshatriyas, all were shrouded by clouds of dust. Duryodhana and Duhsasana encounters the twins. Duryodhana afflicts Nakula and pushes him back. Sahadeva cut off Duhsasana driver head and Duhsasana himself restrained his steeds. Sahadeva pierces his steeds causing them to run hither and thither. Karna battles Vrikodara and coming close to each other in car, an encounter with mace happens. Drona and Arjuna, fought with each other in battle. Drona failed to gain any ascendency over Arjuna. Drona applauded the latter in his heart. Celestial comes to witness that fight and an invisible voice praises both. Drona, invokes into existence the Brahma weapon and Partha baffles it by a Brahma  weapon of his own. Duhsasana encounters Dhrishtadyumna and both afflicts each other. Dhrishtadyumna forced him to turn back, scattering his arrows, and proceeded against Drona. Kritavarman with 3 brothers comes to oppose Dhrishtadyumna and the twins comes from other side to protect him. Duryodhana rush against Dhrishtadyumna but Satyaki stops him. Duryodhana recalls his friendship with him of childhood days, before battle. Duryodhana cut off in twain his bow, then afflicts him. Satyaki afflicts him in return and Duryodhana rest awhile. Karna tries to come but Bhima stops him. Yudhishthira rallies troops against Drona. The Pandavas three crooked-minded warriors, who were Bhimasena and the twins hatches plan with Dhananjaya to kill Drona, but Drona grounded and crushed those heroic combatants. Kesava seeing Drona afflicting all addresses Arjuna that by fair means Drona cannot be defeated, when, however, he lays aside his weapons, he becomes capable of being slain. He discusses if his son Aswatthaman falls, he will cease to fight. Arjuna disapproves but others approves. Bhima slays an elephant naming it Aswatthaman and approaching Drona with bashfulness began to exclaim untrue aloud,'Aswatthaman hath been slain.' Drona however recollecting the prowess of his son, regarded it false. Drona rush towards Dhrishtadyumna army and invoking into existence the Brahma weapon slew 20,000 Panchalas. Then he cut off the head of Vasudana and killed his 11,100 soldiers. Beholding Drona exterminating Kshatriyas, seven Rishis with other celestial sages appears and ask him to stop the slaughter, saying his time had come in men world and he had, with Brahma weapon, burnt men on earth that are unacquainted with weapons, which is not righteous. Hearing these words, Drona became exceedingly cheerless in battle. He proceeds to Yudhishthira as to enquire whether his son had been slain or not, as Yudhishthira never spoken an untruth, even for wealth, and Drona didn't ask anybody else. Govinda knowing this before addressed Yudhishthira that if Drona fighteth so on, his army will be annihilated and sometimes, falsehood is better than truth, if it saves life, one is not touched by sin. Bhimasena tells him about his plan and ask him to lie, as he is reputed to be truthful, all will believe his words. When asked, Yudhishthira said that Ashwatthama (elephant) is dead, with word elephant he spoke within his mouth. Drona in grief becomes vulnerable, and Dhrishtadyumna fixed a shaft to slay him. The preceptor prepared for defence but due his mental instability, the celestial weapons, no longer appeared at his bidding. Then taking up a bow, fought with Dhrishtadyumna and mangled his antagonist. Drona cuts his bow 2 times, felled his driver, and cut off most of his weapons. Then Drona cuts joints of his car. Dhrishtadyumna then taking a sword and shield rush towards Drona covering himself under shelter. Those movements of his were highly applauded by all the troops. Then Drona killed steeds by hurling a dart behind which Dhrishtadyumna was hiding. Dhrishtadyumna did different moves with sword and beholding those beautiful evolutions of Dhrishtadyumna, all the warriors and also the celestials assembled there, were filled with wonder. The regenerate Drona then, cut off the sword&shield and when Drona was about to slay Dhrishtadyumna, Satyaki rescues him. Kesava and Dhananjaya praises Satyaki. Duryodhana, Kripa, and Karna comes for battle, and king Yudhishthira, two sons of Madri and Bhimasena comes to protect Satyaki. Use of celestial weapons occur in that battle. Yudhishthira then rallies troops against Drona and for supporting Dhrishtadyumna. Drona then despatched to Yama's abode 124,000 Kshatriyas, by means of Brahma weapon. Bhima rescues Dhrishtadyumna and take him on his car. Dhrishtadyumna again battles Drona and both invokes into existence the Brahma and diverse other celestial weapons. Dhrishtadyumna destroys all the weapons of Bharadwaja's son, then began to slaughter his army. Drona cuts his bow and pierces the vitals of the prince, making him tremble in pain. Bhima seeing this approaches Drona and says,'Thoust only son is slain, why dost thou not feel ashamed ? He for whom thou hast taken up weapons, and for whom thou livest, he, deprived of life, lieth today on the field of battle, unknown to thee and behind thy back. King Yudhishthira the just hath told thee this. It behoveth thee not to doubt this fact.' Drona in grief began loudly to take the name of Aswatthaman, laying aside his weapons, then sat down on his car in meditation. Dhrishtadyumna taking opportunity, for the revenge of his father's & sons death and also for his humiliation of defeat at Drona's hands, with his sword, lopped off from trunk that speechless head. Dhrishtadyumna enjoys, shouting and whirling his sword. Disregarding the cries of all kings of seizing, he slew Drona. Covered with Drona's blood, he comes down and throws down  that head of Bhardwaja's son before Kaurava army. Beholding that, all soldiers ran away. The Pandavas, gaining victory, begin to make loud sounds. Bhima embracing Dhrishtadyumna says, 'I will again embrace thee, O son of Prishata, as one crowned with victory, when that wretch of a Suta's son shall be slain in battle, as also that other wretch, viz., Duryodhana.'

 8. Narayanastra-mokshana Parva (Chapters: 194–204)
 Kripa tells Ashwatthaman of the unjust death of his father, upsetting him. Drona's son then filled with wrath, returns to the battlefield, telling Duryodhana he is going to use a weapon, no one knoweth on the other side and vows to slay Dhristadyumna with his Panchala army, before his peace. He invokes the weapon of mass destruction, so-called the Narayana weapon, in anger. Meanwhile on Pandavas side, Arjuna talks about morality with Yudhishthira. Bhimasena says they must not fear Drona's son, as he himself will vanquish him. Dhrishtadyumna says, he did nothing wrong, and if by slaying Bhagadatta and Bhishma, he regard that act to be righteous, do not regard his act unrighteous. He tells Arjuna to not reapproach him, he forgive his fault of his speech this time. Arjuna starts to cry, and Satyaki seeing this rebukes him saying, this sinful wretch should be slain by all. Dhrishtadyumna says, powerful forgives weak one, so do he. He criticizes his act of slaughtering armless Bhurisravas, with the help of Arjuna, after his bad beating at the hands of Bhurisravas, and blaming others for righteousness. Dhristadyumna tells him if he will again repeat such harsh words, he will despatch him to Yama's abode. Satyaki, grasping a mace, rush towards that prince saying, he will not speak harshly to him, but will slay him, deserving as he art of slaughter. Bhima urged by Vasudeva seizes him and Sahadeva talks about peace. Dhrishtadyumna smilingly says, release that wight, who is proud of his prowess, he will battle him and after killing him, battle for Pandavas. Then Vasudeva and king Yudhishthira, with great effort, succeeded in pacifying them. Then Narayana weapon take its effect, killing thousands of soldiers. The Narayana weapon has the power to kill everyone who is armed. Krishna realizes the power and scale of the Narayana weapon. He tell everyone to throw down their weapons, and alighting from their vehicles, lay down on ground. Bhima resists and reminds Arjuna his vow of not throwing Gandiva. Arjuna leaving Gandiva comes down from car and tells Bhima to do same. But Bhima rush towards Drona's son fearlessly and that fiery weapon falls upon him. Beholding Bhima overwhelmed by that weapon, Dhananjaya, covered Bhima in Varuna (water) weapon, saving him. Arjuna and Vasudeva ran towards Bhima to check him, unarmed, thus the weapon consumed them not. Vasudeva ask Bhima, 'How is it' and drags him down from his car, laying aside his weapons. As there was now none armed to challenge that weapon, the Narayana weapon, that scorcher of foes, became pacified, saving the Pandavas brothers and their army. Duryodhana address Aswatthaman to use that weapon again, but Aswatthaman says it can only be used  once in lifetime. Duryodhana then tells him to use other weapons. Remembering the slaughter of his sire, Aswatthaman then rush against Dhrushtadyumna. He cut off his bow and car, and then mangles his troops. Panchalas fled and then he afflicted Dhrishtadyumna. Satyaki comes against him and afflicts him. He cut off Aswatthaman bow, car and deeply pierces him. Aswatthaman return on new car and again get mangled by Satyaki. Aswatthaman then addressing Satyaki, shot an arrow, which piercing through the armor and body of Satyaki, entered the earth. Blood flowed from his wound, and he sat down on his car. Seeing him covered all over with blood, his driver bore him away from Drona's son. Five warriors comes with Bhimasena among them against Aswatthaman, who afflicts them all. He then cuts Bhima's bow, cuts arms & head of Sudarsana, Paurava, and prince of Chedis. The mighty-armed Bhima then, cut off Drona's son bow, and with ten golden arrows, pierced Aswatthaman shoulders. Deeply pierced, he supported himself on flagstaff, bathed in blood. Then cutting off Bhima's bow twice, he deeply pierced his driver, felling him into a swoon. Steeds ran away, taking Bhima along. Seeing his force broken, Dhananjaya comes, rallying his troops. Arjuna addresses him harshly to fight, and Aswatthaman became highly angry with him. The valiant Aswatthaman, then, invoked the high-tier Agneya weapon, aiming at all in his vicinity. With the fiery flames of that weapon, hostiles warriors fell down like trees burnt by a raging fire, a thick gloom suddenly shrouded the Pandava host, the sun was no longer visible, the very waters heated, huge elephants fell down on the earth all around uttering fierce cries, others scorched by that weapon ran hither and tither and fell down at last. Beholding the Pandava army thus burning, Kauravas filled with joy. Then Arjuna, invoked into existence the Brahma weapon, dispelling all smokes and dust created. Burnt by the energy of that weapon, a full one unit laid low of Pandava troops. Arjuna's car remained unharmed, as both hosts thought that Kesava and Arjuna had perished. The Pandavas seeing them unwounded filled with joy. Drona's son became exceedingly cheerless and ran away from the fight. On his way, he met Vyasa, and saluting him he asked, why his weapon became fruitless, as the two Krishnas were alive. Vyasa tells him about Nara and Narayana concept, and  armies were withdrawn for nightly rest.

 Later Dhananjaya talks Vyasa about a warrior he saw fighting with a lance on his side. Vyasa tell him he was Sankara, who was protecting his side from Aswatthaman, Karna and Kripa. Vyasa ask him to salute Isana and tell him about Shiva's legends. Vyasa tell him, to go and fight, defeat is not for him, since he had Janardana on his side for his advisor and protector.

English translations
Drona Parva was composed in Sanskrit. Several translations of the book in English are available. Two translations from the 19th century, now in public domain, are those by Kisari Mohan Ganguli and Manmatha Nath Dutt. The translations vary with each translator's interpretations.

Clay Sanskrit Library has published a 15 volume set of the Mahabharata which includes a translation of Drona Parva by Vaughan Pilikian. This translation is modern and uses an old manuscript of the Epic. The translation does not remove verses and chapters now widely believed to be spurious and smuggled into the Epic in 1st or 2nd millennium AD.

Debroy, in 2011, notes that updated critical edition of Drona Parva, after removing verses and chapters generally accepted so far as spurious and inserted with prejudice, has 8 parts, 173 adhyayas (chapters) and 8,069 shlokas (verses). He has published a translated version of the critical edition of Drona Parva in Volume 6 of his series.

Quotations and teachings

Dronābhisheka Parva, Chapter 4:

Dronābhisheka Parva, Chapter 4:

Dronābhisheka Parva, Chapter 5:

Jayadratha-badha Parva, Chapter 148:

Ghatotkacha-badha Parva, Chapter 154:

See also
 Previous book of Mahabharata: Bhishma Parva
 Next book of Mahabharata: Karna Parva

References

External links
Translation by Kisari Mohan Ganguli.

Parvas in Mahabharata
Kurukshetra War